S.E.T.I. 4-Track Club EP is an EP by Norwegian metal band The Kovenant, released on 6 February 2003. A companion piece to the 2003 album SETI, it contains two tracks, "Star by Star" and "The Perfect End", that are 'Club Edits'. The remaining two songs, "Neon" and "Planet of the Apes", are taken from SETI.

Track listing

Personnel
The Kovenant
 Lex Icon - vocals, keyboards 
 Psy Coma - guitars, keyboards, programming 
 Von Blomberg - drums

2003 EPs
Black metal EPs
Industrial metal EPs
Nuclear Blast EPs
The Kovenant albums